The blue-eyed ground dove (Columbina cyanopis) is a species of bird in the family Columbidae. It is endemic to the Cerrado region of Brazil.

Taxonomy and systematics

The blue-eyed ground dove was for a time placed in the monotypic genus Oxypelia. That genus was merged into Columbina by the 1960s. Some plumage features set it apart from other Columbina species and more closely resemble those of the blue ground dove (Claravis pretiosa). The blue-eyed ground dove is monotypic.

Description

The male's head, neck, wing coverts, uppertail coverts, and breast are purplish red. Its lower breast, belly, flanks, shoulders, and back are browner. Its vent and undertail coverts are white. The closed wing shows dark brown and chestnut with iridescent blue spots. The central tail feathers are rufous and the outer ones darker. Its eye is blue surrounded by bare gray skin. The adult female is paler, especially on its underparts. The juvenile has rufous edges on many feathers and the wing's spots are obscure.

Distribution and habitat

The blue-eyed ground dove inhabits open savannah and grasslands in the Brazilian cerrado. The only reliable records since 1980 are in the states of Minas Gerais, Mato Grosso, and Mato Grosso do Sul, and only in the first of these have any been seen since 2007. There are historical records of specimens from Mato Grosso in the early 1800s, São Paulo in 1904, and Goiás in the early 1940s.

Behavior

Feeding

No information on the blue-eyed ground dove's feeding behavior or diet has been published. It presumably feeds on seeds like the others of its genus.

Breeding

No information is available on the blue-eyed ground dove's breeding phenology.

Vocalization

The blue-eyed ground dove's song is "a series of evenly-spaced, soft cooing notes" rendered as "wah", "wuh" or "prrah".

Status

The IUCN has assessed the blue-eyed ground dove as Critically Endangered. "This species is very rare with only few recent records, suggesting that the total population is extremely small. A continuing decline is inferred from rapid rates of habitat loss in the region."

References

External links
BirdLife Species Factsheet.

Columbina (genus)
Birds of the Cerrado
Endemic birds of Brazil
Birds described in 1870
Taxa named by August von Pelzeln
Taxonomy articles created by Polbot